Pallavur Devanarayanan is a 1999 Malayalam drama film, written by Gireesh Puthenchery and directed by V. M. Vinu, in which Mammootty plays the lead titular role, Pallavur Devanarayanan. The music for the film was composed by Raveendran and the lyrics were penned by Gireesh Puthenchery. One of the songs was sung by Mammootty himself.

Plot
Pallavoor Devanarayana Pothuval, aka Devan is a talented drummer. People flock to the festivals just to see him play the drums with utmost devotion. His father opposes his relationship with a girl belonging to a lower caste and forces him to marry a girl of his choice, Vasundhara. Unable to bear his decision, she commits suicide. He leads a very glum life with Vasundhara, though she loves him and takes good care of him. He gets injured while trying to save his teacher's daughter from some miscreants and is taken to an Ayurvedic hospital.

Mezhathoor Vaidyamatam Nampoothiri's granddaughter Seethalakshmi falls in love with him so the doctor asks him to marry her. He refuses and goes back to his wife. She becomes pregnant and simultaneously he learns that the doctor's granddaughter is also pregnant. Everyone in the hospital thinks that he is responsible for it. She loses her sanity after Devan leaves the hospital. Vasundhara dies of shock when she hears rumours about her husband. He goes to the hospital to tell the doctor that he is innocent, but in a fight which follows, he accidentally kills a guy and is sent to jail. What follows is how he comes back from the jail, probes into the strange happenings and brings the truth to light.

Cast

Mammootty as Pallavur Devanarayana Pothuval aka Devan
Thilakan as Pallavur Sreekanta Pothuval 
Sangita as Vasundhara 
Manthra as Seethalakshmi 
N. F. Varghese as Mezhathoor Vaidyamatam Nampoothiri 
Kaviyoor Ponnamma as Bhageerathi 
Jagadish as Kumaran 
Kalabhavan Mani as Vasu 
Sai Kumar as Zachariah 
Nedumudi Venu as Aasan 
Devan as Brahmadattan 
Maniyanpilla Raju as Manavedhan Nampoothiri
Madhupal as Poojari 
Sukumari as Oppol
Oduvil Unnikrishnan as Achuthan Marar 
Kozhikode Narayanan Nair as Sankara Pothuval 
Shivaji as Chandrabhanu 
Mariya as Prabhamayi
Kuthiravattam Pappu as Kunjuraman 
V. K. Sriraman as Mohanakrishnan 
T. P. Madhavan
Tony as Vasundhara's Brother 
C. I. Paul as Rappayi
Abu Salim
Anila Sreekumar
Yamuna
Rekha Ratheesh

Soundtrack

The songs were composed by Raveendran, with lyrics by Gireesh Puthenchery. The song "Poliyopoli Pookkula" was sung by Mammootty himself.

References

External links
 

1990s Malayalam-language films
Indian drama films
Films shot in Palakkad
Films directed by V. M. Vinu
Films scored by Raveendran